Sophie Willan (born 21 October 1987) is an English actress, narrator, writer and comedian.

Early life 
Sophie Willan was born on 21 October 1987, in Bolton where she grew up, and spent time in care as a child, as her mother was a heroin addict. She later worked as an escort to fund her arts career.

Theatre and stand-up comedy 
Willan began her arts career in theatre, founding feminist theatre/cabaret group Eggs Collective.

Willan's stand up takes inspiration from her unusual life experiences. In 2015 she won the Magners New Comedian of the Year award.

In 2016 she took her debut stand-up series On Record, based on her experiences of growing up in and out of the care system, to the Edinburgh Fringe Festival. A nationwide tour followed in 2017, including 10 dates at London's Soho Theatre and a commission to adapt the show into a BBC Radio 4 series, with a second series being greenlit. 

Her second show Branded was an exploration of the labels applied to Willan by other people. In the show she addressed her past as a sex worker. The show received a positive review in The Guardian. Willan performed the show at the Edinburgh Fringe Festival 2017, receiving a Herald Angel Award and a nomination for Best Show.

Television 
Willan is the narrator of Channel 4’s The Circle and joined the cast of Still Open All Hours (BBC One) and Click & Collect (BBC One). She portrayed Carol in Series 4 of sketch show Class Dismissed (CBBC) and has performed comedy on Live from The Comedy Store (Comedy Central) As Yet Untitled (Dave) and The Last Leg Correspondents (C4).

She has also been nominated as a Chortle Best Newcomer, honoured on the BBC New Talent Hot List and became the first recipient of the BBC’s Caroline Aherne Comedy Bursary. She was a South Bank Sky Arts Award Best Breakthrough Nominee in 2018.

In 2020 Willan's sitcom Alma's Not Normal was commissioned for a full series by BBC Two, to be released in 2021, following the success of the pilot. The Mirror called it ‘Phoenix Nights meets Fleabag, guided by the spirit of Victoria Wood’; The Times said, ‘Willan's writing is skilled and clearly very personal...uplifting and strangely enchanting’.

Awards 

Willan won a Television Craft Award for Best Writer: Comedy for the pilot of Alma's Not Normal. In the 2022 British Academy Television Awards, Willan was awarded the Best Female Comedy Performance for her performance in the series, which was nominated for Best Scripted Comedy.

In 2022, Willan received an honorary doctorate from the University of Bolton for her contribution to television and comedy.

Care work 
In 2015, Willan secured funding of over £100,000 to create the multi-platform literary project Stories of Care, creating and curating short stories written by fellow care leavers. The project recruited care leavers across the North West England to take part in the creation of a published children's anthology for looked-after children.

References

External links

UTC Artist Management website

1987 births
Living people
English women comedians
Actors from Bolton
Comedians from Greater Manchester
English television actresses
English stand-up comedians
BAFTA winners (people)